Danny van Haaren (born 21 September 1997) is a Dutch footballer who plays as a midfielder for SV TEC.

Club career
He made his Eerste Divisie debut for Telstar on 17 August 2018 in a game against RKC Waalwijk, as an 81st-minute substitute for Senne Lynen.

Personal life
His older brother Ricky van Haaren is also a footballer.

References

External links
 

1997 births
Footballers from Rotterdam
Living people
Dutch footballers
Netherlands youth international footballers
Association football midfielders
Almere City FC players
SC Telstar players
VV Katwijk players
Eerste Divisie players
Tweede Divisie players